The siege of Medina was an unsuccessful Byzantine attack on the Muslim city of Medina (modern Mdina), Malta in 1053 or 1054. The Muslim inhabitants of the city and their slaves managed to repel a superior Byzantine force, which retreated with heavy losses. After the siege, the slaves who helped the Muslims against the invaders were freed, and the Byzantines never attempted to retake the island.

Background
The city of Medina was built on the site of the Byzantine city of Melite, which had been captured and destroyed by the Aghlabids in 870. According to the chronicler al-Himyarī, the settlement was established in 1048–1049 by a Muslim community and their slaves. Archaeological evidence suggests that the city was already a thriving Muslim settlement by the beginning of the 11th century, so 1048–1049 might be the date when the city was officially founded and its walls were constructed.

Siege

In 445 AH (1053–54 AD), the Byzantine Empire attacked the newly established Muslim settlement on Malta "with many ships and in great numbers." The city of Medina was besieged, and its inhabitants asked for clemency but were refused by the Byzantines. The Muslims had only 400 men, but they were outnumbered by their slaves, so they offered them freedom and their daughters in marriage if they would help them repel the invaders.

The slaves agreed with these terms, and they launched an attack on the Byzantines. The invaders began an assault on the second day, but after some fighting they were repelled "and they fled defeated without looking back." The Byzantines attempted to retreat from the island, but most of them were killed, and only one ship managed to escape. The other ships were taken over by the Muslims, and the slaves were freed as had been promised. The Byzantines never attempted to retake Malta.

Analysis

Most details about the siege of Medina are known from Kitab al-Rawd al-Mitar, which was written by Muhammad bin 'Abd al-Mun'im al-Himyarī in the 15th century. Al-Himyarī's account was discovered in 1931, and the first full edition was published in 1975 in Beirut. The passage relating to Malta remained unknown until being translated to English in 1990. It is one of the most detailed sources about the siege.

The account of the siege does not make it clear as to what was the ethnicity of the slaves who helped the Muslims repel the Byzantines. The source implies that they were not Muslim, and they were most likely not Arabs, although they are believed to have spoken Arabic. They were most likely Sicilian or Slav Christians or Christian converts to Islam, and they were probably assimilated with any Maltese survivors from the massacre of 870.

The city would eventually fall to Roger I of Sicily during the Norman invasion of Malta in 1091.

Notes

References

Conflicts in 1053
Conflicts in 1054
Sieges of the Arab–Byzantine wars
Sieges involving Malta
Sieges involving the Byzantine Empire
Siege of Medina
1050s in the Byzantine Empire
Siege of Medina
1053 in Europe
1054 in Europe
Invasions of Malta